MFK ADV Stará Ľubovňa is a Slovak football club, playing in the town of Stará Ľubovňa.

Current squad

External links 

 Club site 

Stara Lubovna
Association football clubs established in 1923
1923 establishments in Slovakia